António de Deus da Costa Matos Bentes de Oliveira (29 August 1927 – 6 February 2003) known as Bentes, was a Portuguese footballer who played as forward.

External links 
 
 
 

1927 births
Portuguese footballers
Association football forwards
Primeira Liga players
Associação Académica de Coimbra – O.A.F. players
Portugal international footballers
2003 deaths
Sportspeople from Braga